Kunoth is a surname. Notable people with this name include:
Amelia Kunoth (c. 1880s – 1984), Australian aboriginal woman, station developer
Angela Kunoth (born 1963), German mathematician
Oscar Kunoth, Australian politician, ran in 1933 South Australian state election: Albert
Rosalie Kunoth-Monks (1937–2022), Australian actress, activist, and politician